Caladenia ensata, commonly known as the stumpy spider orchid, is a species of orchid endemic to the south-west of Western Australia. It is a common orchid within its natural range and has a single, hairy leaf and up to three pale yellow and red flowers which have short but thick, fleshy glandular tips.

Description
The lateral sepals are a similar size to the dorsal sepal but spread widely and are stiffly held at an angle below horizontal. Flowering occurs from September to early November.

Taxonomy and naming
Caladenia ensata was first described by William Nicholls in 1947 from a specimen he collected on the banks of the King River. The description was published in The Victorian Naturalist. The specific epithet (ensata) is derived from the Latin word ensis meaning "sword" referring to the sword-like tips of the petals and sepals.

Distribution and habitat
Stumpy spider orchid is found between Albany and Augusta in the Jarrah Forest and Warren biogeographic regions where it usually grows in sandy soil in woodland. It is a common orchid but often difficult to locate because of its small size and darker colours.

Conservation
Caladenia ensata  is classified as "not threatened" by the Western Australian Government Department of Parks and Wildlife.

References

ensata
Orchids of Western Australia
Endemic orchids of Australia
Plants described in 1947
Endemic flora of Western Australia